Miklos Dezso Ferenc Udvardy (March 23, 1919 – January 27, 1998) was a Hungarian-American biologist and university instructor. He contributed to a wide variety of disciplines, such as biogeography, evolutionary biology, ornithology, and vegetation classification, contributing 191 papers, 8 books, and 3 maps to the scientific literature.

Early life and career
Udvardy was born on March 23, 1919, in Debrecen, Hungary into a noble family. His father was the nobleman Miklos Udvardy de Udvardy et Básth, and his mother was Elizabeth Komlossy de Komlos. Despite an early interest in birds, his father encouraged him to study law, but he later went on to earn a doctorate in biology from the University of Debrecen in 1942. His first position was as research biologist at the Tihanyi Biological Station on Lake Balaton in western Hungary.

Udvardy left Hungary in 1948, and secured a postdoctoral fellowship at Helsinki University in Finland with Professor Pontus Palmgren (fi), an ornithologist and zoologist. He met his future wife Maud Björklund in 1950, and moved to Uppsala in Sweden. He was Curator of Marine Invertebrates at the Swedish Museum of Natural History in Stockholm for a brief time.

Later career
Miklos and Maud married in 1951 and emigrated to Canada. Udvardy arrived at the University of British Columbia in Vancouver, British Columbia in 1952 and was appointed Assistant Professor in the Department of Zoology in 1953, where he lectured in comparative anatomy and ornithology until 1966. He was a visiting professor at the University of Hawaii during the 1958–1959 academic year, and was Lida Scott Brown Lecturer in Ornithology at the University of California, Los Angeles in the 1963–1964 academic year.

He served as Professor of Biological Sciences at California State University, Sacramento (CSUS) from 1967 until his retirement in 1991. There he sponsored eight graduate students, and spent a year as Visiting Professor at the University of Bonn in Germany, and a year as Fulbright Lecturer at the National Autonomous University of Honduras. Udvardy served as a mentor to an impressive array of graduate students, including at UBC Peter Grant (Princeton), Jean Bedard (Universite Laval, Quebec), Spencer Sealy (University of Manitoba), Kees Vermeer (Canadian Wildlife Service), and at CSUS Raymond Pierotti (University of Kansas). He was an eclectic scholar, teaching biogeography, evolution, ornithology, speciation, among other courses at CSUS. A graduate student award at CSUS was created to honor Udvardy's memory.

Udvardy's work in biogeography was seminal to the field, and his system of biogeographic realms is the basis for the system widely used today. His Map of the Biogeographic Provinces of the World was an important contribution to thinking in biogeography. Working with UNESCO, Udvardy produced a crucial document for conservation entitled A Classification of the Biogeographic Provinces of the World, which was meant to complement the map.

Udvardy came up with the idea of competitive exclusion, but did not use the term by which this idea later became known, so his accomplishment is not widely recognized. He was one of the first to emphasize the role of humans in species dispersal and in introducing species into new environments and the possible consequences of such acts. Udvardy coined the term "zoogeography" to identify studies of the distribution of animals, and published the book Dynamic Zoogeography on the topic.

Miklos Udvardy died of surgical complications in Sacramento, California, on January 27, 1998. He was survived by his wife, Maud, and their three children and two grandchildren.

See also
 Alfred Russel Wallace, who also played a large role in developing the idea of biogeographic realms

Selected publications
 Udvardy, M. D. F. (1975). A classification of the biogeographical provinces of the world. IUCN Occasional Paper no. 18. Morges, Switzerland: IUCN, .
 Udvardy, Miklos D. F. (1975) "World Biogeographical Provinces" (Map). The CoEvolution Quarterly, Sausalito, California.

External links
 In memoriam: Miklos D. F. Udvardy, 1919–1998

1919 births
1998 deaths
20th-century American zoologists
20th-century Hungarian zoologists
American ornithologists
Biogeographers
Hungarian ornithologists
Academic staff of Universidad Nacional Autónoma de Honduras
Academic staff of the University of British Columbia
University of California, Los Angeles faculty